Thimet oligopeptidase is an enzyme that in humans is encoded by the THOP1 gene.

References

Further reading